Dave's Picks Volume 32 is a 3-CD live album by the rock band the Grateful Dead.  It contains the complete concert recorded at the Spectrum in Philadelphia on March 24, 1973.  It was released on November 1, 2019 in a limited edition of 20,000 copies.

Critical reception 
On AllMusic, Timothy Monger said, "Later [in 1973, the Grateful Dead] would launch their own record label with the release of their sixth studio album, Wake of the Flood, and... [they] were still honing a number of that album's cuts here, including the luminous "Here Comes Sunshine" and the lovely "Stella Blue". An air of poignant uplift surrounds parts this Philadelphia show – included here in its entirety – which took place just a couple of weeks after the death of founding member Ron "Pigpen" McKernan."

In Glide Magazine, Doug Collette wrote, "No inclusions are more striking, however, than the segues of "He’s Gone"> "Truckin'"> "Jam"> "Dark Star"> "Sing Me Back Home".... Concluding the string with the doleful likes of Merle Haggard's song is an ideal set-up for the celebratory air the band conjures up immediately after: "Sugar Magnolia" is a deservedly exhilarating transition at this, one of the group’s favorite venues."

Track listing 
Disc 1
First set:
"Bertha" (Jerry Garcia, Robert Hunter) – 6:23
"Beat It On Down the Line" (Jesse Fuller) – 3:40
"Don't Ease Me In" (traditional, arranged by Grateful Dead) – 3:45
"The Race Is On" (Don Rollins) – 3:24
"Cumberland Blues" (Garcia, Phil Lesh, Hunter) – 6:26
"Box of Rain" (Lesh, Hunter) – 5:34
"Row Jimmy" (Garcia, Hunter) – 8:24
"Jack Straw" (Bob Weir, Hunter) – 5:16
"They Love Each Other" (Garcia, Hunter) – 6:00
"Mexicali Blues" (Weir, John Perry Barlow) – 3:58
"Tennessee Jed" (Garcia, Hunter) – 8:12
"Looks Like Rain" (Weir, Barlow) – 7:58
"Wave That Flag" (Garcia, Hunter) – 6:19
"El Paso" (Marty Robbins) – 4:19
Disc 2
"Here Comes Sunshine" (Garcia, Hunter) – 9:14
"Me and Bobby McGee" (Kris Kristofferson, Fred Foster) – 5:45
"Loser" (Garcia, Hunter) – 7:03
"Playing in the Band" (Weir, Mickey Hart, Hunter) – 19:23
Second set:
"Promised Land" (Chuck Berry) – 3:22
"China Cat Sunflower" > (Garcia, Hunter) – 8:05
"I Know You Rider" (traditional, arranged by Grateful Dead) – 5:51
"Big River" (Johnny Cash) – 4:41
"Stella Blue" (Garcia, Hunter) – 7:44
"Me and My Uncle" (John Phillips) – 3:12
Disc 3
"He's Gone" > (Garcia, Hunter) – 13:52
"Truckin'" > (Garcia, Lesh, Weir, Hunter) – 10:04
"Jam" > (Grateful Dead) – 22:30
"Dark Star" > (Garcia, Hart, Bill Kreutzmann, Lesh, Ron "Pigpen" McKernan, Weir, Hunter) – 4:10
"Sing Me Back Home" > (Merle Haggard) – 10:03
"Sugar Magnolia" (Weir, Hunter) – 9:43
Encore:
"Johnny B. Goode" (Berry) – 3:55

Personnel 
Grateful Dead
Jerry Garcia – guitar, vocals
Donna Jean Godchaux – vocals
Keith Godchaux – keyboards
Bill Kreutzmann – drums
Phil Lesh – bass, vocals
Bob Weir – guitar, vocals
Production
Produced by Grateful Dead
Produced for release by David Lemieux
Associate Producers: Ivette Ramos & Doran Tyson
Mastering: Jeffrey Norman
Recording: Rex Jackson, Kidd Candelario
Art direction, design: Steve Vance
Cover art: Tyler Crook
Photos: E.E. Stern

Charts

References 

32
Rhino Records live albums
2019 live albums